Tara County is one of the 141 Cadastral divisions of New South Wales. It is located in the south-western corner of the state, to the north of the Murray River, and to the east of the border with South Australia. The Darling Anabranch River is the eastern boundary. It includes the Tarawi Nature Reserve and the localities of Huntingfield, Pine Camp, Nulla, Warranangra and Rufus River, as well as Lake Victoria.

Tara is believed to be derived from a local Aboriginal word.

Parishes within this county
A full list of parishes found within this county; their current LGA and mapping coordinates to the approximate centre of each location is as follows:

References

Counties of New South Wales